Saahil Jain (born 22 October 1998) is an Indian cricketer. He made his first-class debut on 25 December 2019, for Assam in the 2019–20 Ranji Trophy. He made his List A debut on 21 February 2021, for Assam in the 2020–21 Vijay Hazare Trophy.

References

External links
 

1998 births
Living people
Indian cricketers
Assam cricketers
Place of birth missing (living people)